Vladimir Sergeevich Pravdin, or Roland Lyudvigovich Abbiate, codename LETCHIK ["Pilot"], (15 August 1905 – 1970) was a senior NKVD officer and assassin working in Europe during the Great Terror. He later became a KGB agent, stationed in the United States.

Career
During the 1930s, Pravdin was involved in killings and kidnappings in Europe for the KGB, including the assassination of Ignace Reiss, a GRU officer who defected in 1937.  Reiss was caught by the NKVD in Switzerland, where he was killed as an object lesson to potential defectors. Pravdin disappeared after the murder. Later, during World War II, he turned up again in the United States where he served as a Soviet diplomat, Vladimir Sergeyvich Pravdin.

Later, in the United States, Pravdin operated under cover as the head of TASS News Agency from 1944 to 1945. Among Pravdin's contacts while serving in the United States were Judith Coplon, Josef Katz, and Josef Berger.

In Washington, Pravdin, posing as a TASS reporter, made the acquaintance of such people as the famous correspondent Walter Lippmann and others. On one occasion, he met with a person with three children to offer money for certain unspecified information and who was code-named by the KGB as BLIN ("bliny" is Russian for "pancake"). In the plain language of the cable decrypt, BLIN was willing to provide information but declined to cooperate with the NKVD because the approach had been clumsy, but left open the possibility of future cooperation.  

From scraps of information about BLIN  that arose from the brief breaking of the Russian code in the materials the U.S. known as the Venona project, the FBI concluded that BLIN "appears" to be I.F. Stone.  However, Stone biographer Myra MacPherson has contended that the FBI was uncertain about whether BLIN was, in fact, Stone. She noted that unlike Stone, BLIN was identified as someone "whose true pro-Soviet sympathies were not known to the public...." The FBI also considered the possibility of Ernest K. Lindley, who better fit the profile of a "very prominent journalist" and/like Stone (and BLIN) had three children. Another cable indicated that BLIN was afraid of contact with Pravdin, lest he draw the attention of J. Edgar Hoover. Stone was already attacking Hoover frequently in 1943, and the FBI was of the view that "Stone is known to the bureau because of his hostile editorial comments made against the FBI as early as 1936."

In 1945, while he was serving as a senior adviser to the American delegation at the founding conference of the United Nations, Assistant Secretary of the U.S. Treasury Harry Dexter White met with Pravdin and answered a series of questions about U.S. negotiating strategy and possible ways for Moscow to defeat or water down American postwar proposals. Pravdin left the United States and returned to the Soviet Union on 11 March 1946.

Anatoliy Golitsyn, another Soviet defector in the 1960s, also claimed that Pravdin was active in Austria after World War II and often passed as a Frenchman.

Personal life and death
Pravdin's wife, Olga Pravdin, also served in the KGB.
Pravdin died in 1970 in Moscow.

References

External links 
 United States. A Counterintelligence Reader. Vol. 1 Chap. 4. National Counterintelligence Center. no date.
 FBI Venona file - page 37
 FBI Albert Einstein file
 Venona: Decoding Espionage in America, John Earl Haynes and Harvey Klehr, Yale University Press, 1999, pgs. 53, 158, 212, 225, 237, 240, 241, 242, 243, 248.
 The Venona Story by Robert L. Benson
 }
 Information on Vladimir Pravdin

1905 births
1970 deaths
Soviet spies
KGB officers
Soviet assassins
People from London
French emigrants to the Soviet Union